The 1957 Havana Presidential Palace attack was a failed assassination attempt on the life of President Fulgencio Batista at the Presidential Palace in Havana, Cuba. The attack began at around 3:30 PM on March 13, 1957, carried out by Menelao Mora’s group, group of members of the Patido Auténtico and the student opposition group Directorio Revolucionario Estudiantil (DRE), but was unsuccessful in its goal of killing Batista. According to one of the group's founding members, Faure Chomón, they were following the golpe arriba strategy and sought to overthrow the government by killing Batista.

The same day, a similar attack occurred at the Radio Reloj at the Radiocentro CMQ Building.  The plan was to announce Batista's death over Radio Reloj; however, this attack also failed.

Attack

The plan of attack, as explained by Faure Chaumón Mediavilla, was to secure the Presidential Palace by a commando of fifty men (46 participated) and simultaneously support the operation by one hundred men occupying the radio station Radio Reloj at the Radiocentro CMQ Building to announce the death of Batista. The attack on the palace would result in the elimination of Fulgencio Batista.

Presidential Palace attack 
At 3:40 pm, the main assault force arrived before the main entrance to the Presidential Palace in two sedans and a delivery truck. They were armed with rifles, submachine guns, pistols, and grenades. All were in shirtsleeves for identification, since suits or uniforms were required for persons within the palace. 

Twelve government soldiers on guard at the entrance were shot or scattered. Of the 46 attackers, nine were able to reach the second floor of the east wing of the palace, about ten were shot down in the open area before the building and the remainder occupied part of the ground floor. The palace switchboard was disabled with a grenade. 

Batista's office on the third floor was reached by a group of the rebel force and two of his guards were killed near his desk. Batista himself had retreated to the presidential suite on the top floor where the palace defenders rallied and fired on the attackers both within the palace and the forecourt below. At this point military and police reinforcements arrived while tanks were summoned. The rebels within the palace were forced to retreat, some being killed on the main staircase. Only three escaped the building. 

The main assault force was to be supported by a group of 100 armed men who would occupy the tallest buildings in the surrounding area of the Presidential Palace (La Tabacalera, the Sevilla Hotel, the Palace of Fine Arts) and, from these positions, support the main force. However, this secondary support operation was not carried out as the militants assigned to capture the buildings hesitated and did not arrive.

The attackers spoke in code to frustrate a potential infiltration or a divulging of the attack in any conversation. It had been agreed early on that they would refer to the palace as "la casa de los tres kilos."

Although the attackers reached the third floor of the palace, they did not locate or harm Batista.

Radio Reloj attack 
The attack at Radio Reloj, located in the Radiocentro CMQ Building at Calle 23 and L in El Vedado, was led by José Antonio Echeverría who was accompanied among others, by Fructuoso Rodríguez, Joe Westbrook, Raúl Diaz Argüelles, and Julio García Olivera. The group departed from a basement apartment located on Calle 19 between Calles B and C towards the Radiocentro CMQ Building in three automobiles, including a delivery truck. At 3:21 PM on March 13, 1957, José Antonio arrived at Radio Reloj and after being announced, read a prepared statement over the radio, announcing Batista's death despite that such an event had not actually happened.

"People of Cuba, in these moments the dictator Fulgencio Batista has just been justified. In his own burrow of the Presidential Palace, the people of Cuba have come to settle accounts. And it is we, the Revolutionary Directory, who in the name of the Cuban Revolution have given the shot of grace to this regime of opprobrium. Cubans listening to me. It's just been removed..."

The operation failed, Batista was never killed, and the troops guarding the Radio Reloj transmission tower in Arroyo Arenas had knocked down the transmission. José Antonio was shot and killed by police on the corner of November 27 and L, on his way back to the university.

Otto Hernández Fernández, the last survivor of the Radio Reloj attack, recalled the events:

Casualties

Twenty of the 100 members of Batista's presidential guard were killed. Forty-two rebels participated in the attack against the palace; 34 were from the Partido Autentico, and the rest were from the Student Directory.

Killed at the Presidential Palace were Menelao Mora Morales, 52, Carlos Gutíerrez Menoyo (brother of Eloy Gutiérrez Menoyo), 34, José Luis Gómez Wangüemert, 31, José Briñas Garcia, 26, Ubaldo (Waldo) Diaz Fuentes, 28, Abelardo Rodriguez Mederos, 30 (driver of one of the cars), José Castellanos Valdes, (alias "Ventrecha"), 35, Evelio Prieto Guillaume, 33, Adolfo Delgado, Eduardo Panizo Bustos, 32, Pedro Esperon, 45, Reinaldo León Llera, 39, Norberto Hernández Nodal, 45, Pedro Nulasco Monzón, 30, Pedro Tellez Valdes, 37, Mario Casañas Díaz, 28, Asterlo Enls Masa de Armas, 25, Gerardo Medina Candentey, Carlos Manuel Pérez Domingues, 45, Angel Salvador González González, 54, Adolfo Raúl Delgado Rodriguez, 29, Ramón Alraro Betancourt, 36, Celestino Pacheco, Eduardo Domingues Aguilar, 50, Pedro Zayden Rivera, 25, Luis Felipe Almeida Hernandez, 35, José Hernández, Salvador Alfaro, and Ormani Arenado Llonch.

Killed at Radio Reloj were José Azef, Aestor Bombino, José Antonio Echevarria, Otto Hernandez, and Pedro Martinez Brito.

Surviving the attack were Angel Eros, Amador Silveriño (driver of the "Fast Delivery" truck.), Orlando Manrique, Orlando Lamadrid Velazco, Sergio Pereda Velazco, Santiago Aguero, Manuel Toranzo, Ricardo Olmedo (injured during attack; later shot for attempting to kill Fidel Castro), 40, Faure Chomón, Antonio Castell Valdes, Juan Gualberto Valdes, José M. Olivera, Marcos Leonel Remigio González, Juan José Alfonso Zuñiga, Evelio Álvarez, and Luís Goicochea.

Aftermath

The Havana Urgency court announced there would be a trial on April 5, 1957, for those charged in the March 13 attacks. Two individuals were under arrest to be tried: Orlando Olmedo Moreno, wounded during the attack, and Efrain Alfonso Liriano. All others connected with the attack either escaped or were killed.

Public Act of Redress 

The public act of redress by the people of Havana for the assault of March 13 on the Presidential Palace took place on April 7, 1957. It was reported that more than 250,000 people attended.

Golpeando Arriba 
On January 22, 1959, Fidel Castro explained to journalists gathered in the Copa Room of the Havana Riviera hotel, among other topics, that hitting up, "golpear arriba," was one of the "false concepts about the revolution" because "tyranny is not a man; tyranny is a system (...) We were never supporters of tyrannicide or military coups, [which tended] to inculcate the people a complex of impotence " A few months earlier Castro had reprimanded Guevara for having signed a pact with Rolando Cubela, Chomon's lieutenant in the DR-13-3 guerrilla in Escambray mountains, the "Pacto del Pedrero". The letter is dated in Palma Soriano on December 26, 1958; part of it reads:

Humboldt 7 massacre 

The failure of the attacks led to a widespread police crackdown on anti-Batista militants, often involving extrajudicial killings of revolutionaries, regardless of whether they were armed or fighting back. On April 20, 1957, four unarmed DRE revolutionaries who were previously involved in the attack were shot and killed by Havana police as they attempted to flee their apartment safehouse during a raid. The event led to widespread criticism of the police and, after the revolution, resulted in the arrest, trial and execution (1964) of Marcos Rodriguez (Marquitos), another revolutionary who betrayed the four men.

See also

 Humboldt 7 massacre
 Radiocentro CMQ Building
 Presidential Palace
 Directorio Revolucionario Estudiantil
 Faure Chomón
 José Antonio Echeverría
 Rolando Cubela Secades
 Eloy Gutiérrez Menoyo

Notes

References

Additional reading
Attack on the Presidential Palace (March 13, 1957)

External links
Cuando los universitarios se levantaron contra el gobernante de Cuba (FOTOS)
Revolt in Havana. Chicago Daily Tribune. March 14, 1957.]
No Eran Estudiantes los Que Atacaron el Palacio.

 Verdades del Ataque al Palacio Presidencial el 13 de Marzo de 1957

Cuban Revolution
Opposition to Fidel Castro
1957 deaths
March 1957 events in North America
People of the Cuban Revolution
Cuban soldiers
Cuban revolutionaries
Failed assassination attempts in North America
1957 in Cuba